Xichang, formerly known as Jiandu, Jianchang and Ningyuan(fu), is a city in and the seat of the Liangshan Yi Autonomous Prefecture, in the south of Sichuan, China. In 2012 it had a population of 481,796.

History
The Qiongdu were the local people at the time of contact with China. The county of Qiongdu is attested in the area from the Han dynasty. Under the Song dynasty, a local lord was given the title of "King of the Qiongdu" (Qiongdu Wang). The area formed part of the medieval Kingdom of Dali and was subdued by the Mongolians from 1272–4, after which it was incorporated into Yunnan of the Yuan dynasty. It was organized as the Jiandu Ningyuan duhufu, qianhufu, or wanhufu but continued to be often known as Jiandu. Under the Qing, it was officially known as Ningyuan Commandery but also continued to be referenced under the old name Jianchang. In the 19th century, it was the center of Sichuan's production of "white wax".

Roman Catholicism (see also Catholic Church in Sichuan) was introduced to Ningyuan in the 18th century by Paris Foreign Missions Society. The Apostolic Vicariate of Kienchang was established in 1910, which was elevated to a diocese in 1946. The episcopal residence is located next to the Cathedral of the Angels, Xichang.

Xichang was devastated by a magnitude 7.5 earthquake in 1850, which killed more than 20,000 people.

Geography
Xichang lies in a mountainous region of far southern Sichuan. The city is just northeast of the prefecture-level city of Panzhihua. The Anning River is the main river in the area. It is an affluent of the Yalong, Jinsha, and Yangtze rivers. It lies near Qiong Lake.

Climate
Owing to its low latitude and high elevation, Xichang has a monsoon-influenced humid subtropical climate (Köppen Cwa) milder and far sunnier than the Sichuan Basin, with mild, very sunny and dry winters, and very warm, rainy summers. Over 60% of the  annual precipitation occurs from June to August. With monthly percent possible sunshine ranging from 36% in September to 72% in January, the city receives 2,367 hours of bright sunshine annually.

Transportation
Xichang Railway Station (西昌站) is a main station on the Chengdu–Kunming railway. Construction of a fast express train line has been completed, and has considerably shortenened travelling times to Panzhihua, Chengdu and Guangyuan. There are also some other stations in the city, including the Xichang North railway station and Xichang South railway station.

The city possesses its own airport, Xichang Qingshan Airport, which is attached to the spaceport by a railroad line and a motorway directly.

Xichang lies on the G5 Beijing–Kunming Expressway.

Spaceport

Communications satellites are the most common payload to be inserted into orbit from the Xichang spaceport.

Explanatory notes

References

Citations

General and cited references 
 .
 . 
 .
 .
  (Congressional report discussing Intelsat 708 launch failure and possible technology transfer)
  (Documents on Intelsat 708 and export controls, including State Department letter charging two companies with export law violations)
  (Article on the crash of a rocket carrying a commercial payload on February 15, 1996)

External links
 https://web.archive.org/web/20050129090651/http://www.astronautix.com/sites/xichang.htm
 http://www.globalsecurity.org/space/world/china/xichang.htm
 "A World Away from Beijing", by Ross Terrill. The New York Times, December 20, 1987.

 
County-level cities in Sichuan
Liangshan Yi Autonomous Prefecture
National Forest Cities in China